Victoria Azarenka defeated Maria Sharapova in the final, 6–3, 6–0 to win the women's singles tennis title at the 2012 Australian Open. It was her first major title. Azarenka became the first Belarusian to reach and win a major final, and became the world No. 1 in doing so. Caroline Wozniacki, Petra Kvitová and Maria Sharapova were also in contention for the top ranking.

Kim Clijsters was the defending champion, but was defeated in the semifinals by Azarenka.

For the first time in the tournament's history, all eight quarterfinalists were European. This was also the first major main draw appearance for future three-time major champion and world No. 1 Ashleigh Barty, who was defeated in the first round by Anna Tatishvili.

Seeds

Qualifying

Wildcards

Draw

Finals

Top half

Section 1

Section 2

Section 3

Section 4

Bottom half

Section 5

Section 6

Section 7

Section 8

Championship match statistics

Notes

References
General

Specific

External links
 2012 Australian Open – Women's draws and results at the International Tennis Federation

Women's Singles
2012
2012 in Australian women's sport
2012 WTA Tour